This is a list of '''East Tennessee State Buccaneers football players in the NFL Draft.

Key

Selections
Source:

References

East Tennessee State

East Tennessee State Buccaneers NFL Draft